Bakit Manipis ang Ulap? was a Philippine drama series broadcast by TV5 starring Claudine Barretto, Diether Ocampo, Cesar Montano and Meg Imperial. Barretto and Ocampo reunited from Star Cinema's Calvento Files: The Movie, Dahil Mahal na Mahal Kita and Soltera, and ABS-CBN's telenovela Mula sa Puso, Saan Ka Man Naroroon, Ikaw ang Lahat sa Akin and Iisa Pa Lamang. It is based on the 1985 film of the same title created by Danny Zialcita. It premiered on February 15, 2016. However, due to low ratings and negative comments about the show, the management of TV5 decided to cancel the show, and aired its final episode on April 22, 2016 after almost two months of airing.

This was the last teledrama offering for more than 5 years since 2011 with Babaeng Hampaslupa.

The story revolves around Marla, a woman who falls victim of an illicit affair with Miguel. She is also the love of George's life. George has been a good friend, but Marla has always loved Miguel even since college. Later on, Miguel marries Katrina to keep the family business from afloat. Marla falls in love with a new suitor, Ricardo, a rich businessman. Problems escalate when Marla becomes the stepmother of Alex, whom she met several times.

The series reran on TV5 in 2021 and internationally on Kapatid5 cable channel. The series is being rebroadcast on Sari Sari Channel in 2023.

Cast

Main cast
Claudine Barretto as Marla Alvarez
Diether Ocampo as George Bustamante
Cesar Montano as Ricardo Villafuerte
Meg Imperial as Alexandra "Alex" Villafuerte

Supporting cast 
 Carmina Manzano as Leticia Maximilliano
Bernard Palanca as Miguel "Migs" Custodio
Mariel de Leon as Rhona Custodio
Dindi Gallardo as Serena Almodal
Ruffa Gutierrez as Vera Strong
Roxanne Barcelo as Katrina Alarcon
Samantha Lopez as Digna Herrera
Janelle Jamer as Bernadette De Jesus
Bret Jackson as Pax Almodal
Maxel Flores - now, Max Corpuz as Rydel
Issa Pressman as Rowena

See also
List of programs aired by TV5 (Philippine TV network)

References

External links
Official website of TV5 (Philippines)

TV5 (Philippine TV network) drama series
Philippine drama television series
Philippine melodrama television series
2016 Philippine television series debuts
2016 Philippine television series endings
Live action television shows based on films
Filipino-language television shows
Television series by Viva Television